Alizé Cornet was the defending champion, but lost to Camila Giorgi in the first round.

Monica Puig won her first WTA title, defeating Sílvia Soler Espinosa in the final 6–4, 6–3.

Seeds 

 Sloane Stephens (first round)
 Alizé Cornet (first round)
 Kirsten Flipkens (first round)
 Andrea Petkovic (quarterfinals)

 Elena Vesnina (first round)
 Bojana Jovanovski (first round)
 Peng Shuai (second round)
 Alison Riske (second round)

Draw

Finals

Top half

Bottom half

Qualifying

Seeds

  Zheng Jie (qualifying competition)
  Zarina Diyas (moved to main draw)
  Misaki Doi (qualifying competition)
  Olga Govortsova (qualified)
  Anna Tatishvili (qualifying competition, retired)
  Mirjana Lučić-Baroni (qualified)
  Sílvia Soler Espinosa (qualified)
  Luksika Kumkhum (first round)
  Zheng Saisai (qualifying competition)

Qualifiers

  Mirjana Lučić-Baroni
  Ashleigh Barty
  Sílvia Soler Espinosa
  Olga Govortsova

Draw

First qualifier

Second qualifier

Third qualifier

Fourth qualifier

References
Main Draw
Qualifying Draw

Internationaux de Strasbourgandnbsp;- Singles
2014 Singles
2014 in French tennis